Hamisa Hassan Mobetto (born December 10, 1994), is a Tanzanian singer, model, businesswoman and socialite.

Early life and education
She was born in Mwanza, Tanzania on the 10th December 1994 to a Muslim family and was passionate about music as a child. She pursued her career in music after completing high school.

Career

Model
In 2011, she participated for the Miss Indian Ocean 2011 beauty pageant, she emerged as 2nd runner up. That same year, she also emerged second which made her compete for Miss Tanzania 2011. In 2012, she participated in Miss University Africa and succeeded among the top 10.

In 2017, She was nominated for People’s Choice Award and Super Mum at the Starqt International Awards.

In 2018, she won Female stylish Of The Year at the Swahili fashion Week Awards. That same year, she was appointed as the host of Miss Tanzania Beauty pageant. That same year, she was nominated for Best East African Woman Entrepreneur at the BEFFTA Awards.

In December 2020, she won Best Female Digital Model of the Year at the Tanzania Digital Awards.

Music
In 2017, Hamisa appeared on a video with Diamond Platnumz on the hit single Salome.

In 2018, she released her debut single "Madam Hero". The single introduced her in Bongo Flava industry as a musician and has since garnered over two million views on YouTube. In that same year she released the single "Tunaendana".

In 2021, she launched her own record label, Mobetto Music.

Personal life
Mobetto was previously in a relationship with Francis Ciza and they became the parents of a daughter, Fantasy Majizzo. She was then in a relationship with singer Diamond Platnumz and they welcomed a son, Deedalayan Abdul Naseeb, in 2017. The couple later broke up for unknown reasons.

In September 2021, it was rumoured that she was in a relationship with American rapper Rick Ross.

Awards and nominations

References

External links
 

Living people
1994 births
21st-century Tanzanian women singers
Tanzanian socialites
Tanzanian women in business
Tanzanian female models
 Tanzanian Bongo Flava musicians
 Swahili-language singers